Panaka leads here. For Captain Panaka, a fictional character in Star Wars, see List of Star Wars characters#Captain Quarsh Panaka
A panaka, panaqa  or panaca was a family formed by all the descendants of a monarch, a Sapan Inka, excluding from it the son who would succeed in his reign. The basic social institution of the Incas is the ayllu. An ayllu is a group of families that descended from a common ancestor, united by culture and religion, in addition to the agricultural work, livestock and fishing of the same territory. Ayllu concept transcended into nobility, so that the royal kinship could establish a lineage, called panaka or royal house.

The family of each Inca formed a royal ayllu that received the name of panaka, a royal lineage. The only son of the Sapan Inka who was not part of the panaka was the Auqui (crown prince) because the latter, when he became emperor, would form his own panaka.

Among other functions occupied by the panaka were those of maintaining the memory of the deceased Inca and his mallki (mummy), of performing ceremonies in his name and of taking care of his goods and alliances made in life. Each panaka owned several holdings across the realm, including a palaces in the sacred city of Qusqu, the city core was composed principally of palatial enclosures known as kancha owned by the Panakas. Panakas had great influence on the decision of the appointment of successors to the Sapan Inka position.

List of Panaka 
The capaccuna was the official list of panakas and their respective ancestor, other ethnic Inca ayllu familia existed but only the most prominent lineages were inside the capaccuna, and had the right to be called panaka.

According to the Incas, the panakas were these, in chronological order:

Rurin Qusqu moiety:

 Chima Panaka Ayllu (Manku Qhapaqpa panakan), the royal house of Manku Qhapaq.
 Rawrawa Panaka Ayllu (Sinchi Ruq'ap panakan), the royal house of Sinchi Ruqa.
 Hawaynin Panaka Ayllu (Lluq'i Yupankip panakan), the royal house of Lluq'i Yupanki.
 Uska Mayta Panaka Ayllu (Mayta Qhapaqpa panakan), the royal house of Mayta Qhapaq.
 Apu Mayta Panaka Ayllu (Qhapaq Yupankip panakan), the royal house of Qhapaq Yupanki.

Hanan Qusqu moiety:

 Wikakiraw Panaka Ayllu (Inka Ruqap panakan), the royal house of Inka Ruqa.
 Awqaylli Panaka (Yawar Waqaqpa panakan), the royal house of Yawar Waqaq.
 Suqsu Panaka Ayllu (Wiraqucha Inkap panakan), the royal house of Wiraqucha Inka.
 Hatun Ayllu / Iñaka Panaka Ayllu (Pachakutiq Yupankip panakan), the royal house of Pachakutiq Yupanki.
 Qhapaq Ayllu (Tupaq Yupankip panakan), the royal house of Tupaq Yupanki.
 Tumipampa Ayllu (Wayna Qhapaqpa panakan), the royal house of Wayna Qhapaq.

Inca
The ayllu clans and their panaka counterpart were the basic Inca social unit of Inca organization, panaka were one of the most important links in the Inca administration, simultaneously in the political, social, economic and cultural aspects of the state of the Tawantinsuyu.

See also 

 Ayllu
 Inca Emperors
 Inca Government

References 

Family